My Secret Life may refer to:
 My Secret Life (memoir), by "Walter", the memoir of a Victorian gentleman's sexual development and experiences
 My Secret Life (Sonia Dada album), 1998
 My Secret Life (Eric Burdon album), 2004
 My Secret Life (Billy Ruffian album), 2007
 My Secret Life (Julee Cruise album), 2011